This article is an annex to Universidad de San Carlos.  For information on the university, see: Universidad de San Carlos de Guatemala.

A

B

C

D

F

G

H

I

L

M

O

P

Q

R

S

U

V

Z

Presidents of Guatemala and other Central America countries

Notes and references

Notes

References

Bibliography

External links 

History of Guatemala
Universidad de San Carlos de Guatemala